Owen High School is located in Owen, Wisconsin.

History
The school opened in 1921, also hosting the public library and community events for many years. It was designed for students to move from one specialized classroom (e.g. a lab) to another, which was a rather new idea at the time.

It was added to the State and the National Register of Historic Places in 2004.

References

School buildings on the National Register of Historic Places in Wisconsin
Libraries on the National Register of Historic Places in Wisconsin
National Register of Historic Places in Clark County, Wisconsin
Public high schools in Wisconsin
Schools in Clark County, Wisconsin
Late 19th and Early 20th Century American Movements architecture
School buildings completed in 1921
1921 establishments in Wisconsin